Moth Fight is an American experimental pop outfit based in Austin, Texas. Their sound is a blend of orchestral instrumentation (trumpets, cellos, violins, banjos, barbershop harmony), tape loops, samples, synthesizers, and circuit bent toys.

Discography

US singles
 Hopscotch (2007) Natrix Natrix Records

Compilations 
 "Rev. Sharp's Invention (Live)" featured on Technicolor Yawn: KVRX Local Live Vol. 12 (2008) KVRX
 "A Long Way from Home" featured on HABITAT (2008) Asthmatic Kitty

Trivia
 The song "Hopscotch" is apparently inspired by Julio Cortázar's novel Hopscotch and includes lyrics written in Gliglish, the constructed language La Maga teaches Horacio.

 "Hopscotch, pt. 2" references both Lewis Carroll's Jabberwocky and the Grimm Brothers' White and Black Bride

See also
 Music of Austin

References
 Sources consulted 
 
 
 
 
 Endnotes

External links
 Myspace

Musical groups established in 2007
Indie rock musical groups from Texas
Barbershop music
Musical groups from Austin, Texas
New Weird America
American experimental musical groups
Psychedelic folk groups
Dream pop musical groups
Shoegazing musical groups
2007 establishments in Texas